The Wisconsin Hybrid Vehicle Team consists mainly of undergraduate students from the University of Wisconsin–Madison who work together to build a hybrid electric vehicle.

The Team
Many of the members have little to no previous automotive experience. New team members are taught alongside veteran student members. This passing of knowledge ensures a legacy that is carried on to younger generations.

The team is subdivided into five major groups to handle necessary tasks. The Mechanical and Drivetrain groups work to design and implement new components, renovate old parts, and perform general vehicle maintenance. The Control and Electrical Groups are responsible for maintaining all of the vehicle computer and electrical components; this includes developing a complex control strategy and programing the electronic control unit, rewiring the vehicle to accommodate the hybrid systems, and maintaining the battery pack as well as other electrically sensitive components. The Outreach group is responsible for publishing newsletters, maintaining the website, obtaining positive relationships with local businesses and community, and involving the team in community events.
Each group is led by a veteran team member who meet to coordinate projects and make decisions for the vehicle's progress. Each leader is responsible to teach each of the groups attendants safely.

Past Competitions

Current Competition
The EcoCar Challenge is a three-year competition sponsored by the U.S. DOE, GM, and Argonne National Labs for 2008-2010. Seventeen universities from the US and Canada were selected to participate.
In the first year, teams concentrated on designing, modeling, and simulating their teams proposed vehicle architecture. Additionally, teams worked to create a functional HIL (hardware-in-the-loop) to demonstrate their capability to manage a vehicle's ECU. The first year's competition was completed in June 2009 in Toronto, OH Canada.

In the first year of the competition, the UWHVT developed an architecture that was a powersplit hybrid design. Technical papers were created at intervals throughout the year dictating decisions and results of simulations. It consists of a prototype traction motor, the 150 kW Continental AG Sapphire drive. A Weber MPE 750 engine (operating on E85) and the Delphi DU174 motor (found in the EV1) complete the genset. A clutch implemented in between the DU174 and the Weber allow for efficient all electric drive, while a clutch implemented in between the DU174 and the rear differential allows the Weber engine to be directly coupled to the road at highway speeds. Lastly, the battery pack located in the spare rear wheel compartment will be a Johnson Controls Saft 41Ah lithium-ion pack.

The UWHVT expects to receive its stock Saturn Vue in August 2009 and proceed building the vehicle in year 2. Competition for year two of the challenge will be in Yuma, AZ at GM's new proving ground.

External links
UW Madison Hybrid Vehicle Team Homepage
Garage Cameras in the UW Vehicle Teams Garage
Argonne National Laboratories
EcoCar Challenge: The NeXt Generation
Department of Energy
General Motors Corporation
Challenge Bibendum: Portal of sustainable road mobility

Automotive technologies
Green vehicles
Hybrid vehicles
One-off cars
Electric vehicle organizations